Johannes Hermanus "Han" ten Broeke (born 2 March 1969) is a Dutch politician who served as a member of the House of Representatives from 30 November 2006 until 4 September 2018. A member of the People's Party for Freedom and Democracy (Volkspartij voor Vrijheid en Democratie, VVD), he focused his parliamentary work on matters of foreign policy and the Armed forces of the Netherlands.

Born in Haaksbergen, Ten Broeke studied political science with a specialization in international relations at Leiden University.

After winning a parliamentary seat in the general election of 2006 he was reelected in 2010, 2012 and 2017. He stepped down in 2018 as a member of the House of Representatives after an article in HP/De Tijd revealed that in 2013 Ten Broeke, then 44, had engaged in an affair with a 25-year old junior staffer that worked for his parliamentary group.

Other activities
 European Council on Foreign Relations (ECFR), Member of the Council

References

  Parlement.com biography

External links 

  Han ten Broeke  personal website
  House of Representatives biography
  People's Party for Freedom and Democracy biography

1969 births
Living people
Dutch political scientists
Dutch public relations people
Leiden University alumni
Members of the House of Representatives (Netherlands)
People from Haaksbergen
People's Party for Freedom and Democracy politicians
21st-century Dutch politicians